KLMA (96.5 FM) is a radio station licensed to serve the community of Hobbs, New Mexico, USA. It is owned by Ojeda Broadcasting, Inc. and broadcasts a Spanish variety format.

The station was assigned the KLMA call letters by the Federal Communications Commission on November 10, 1993.

References

External links
 Official Website
 FCC Public Inspection File for KLMA
 

LMA
Radio stations established in 1994
1994 establishments in New Mexico
LMA
Lea County, New Mexico